House Auction is a programme on the United Kingdom television station Channel 4 which aired during the channel's weekday daytime programming. As the name suggests, the show features cases of housing or property for sale at auctions, and follows the story of what happens with the property being refurbished and made into a home or some type of business such as, in one case, a dentist.

See also
 Channel 4

References

External links

Profile at Channel4.com

2003 British television series debuts
2005 British television series endings
2000s British documentary television series
Channel 4 original programming
Television series by Tiger Aspect Productions
Television series by Endemol
English-language television shows
Auction television series